WEQR may refer to:

 WPLW-FM, a radio station (96.9 FM) licensed to Goldsboro, North Carolina that used the call sign WEQR from 1950 to 1989
 WKJO (FM), a radio station (102.3 FM) licensed to Smithfield, North Carolina that used the call sign WEQR from 1991 to 2001
 WZKT, a radio station (97.7 FM) licensed to Walnut Creek, North Carolina that used the call sign WEQR from 2008 to 2014